Mill Branch is a tributary of the Duck River in Hickman County, Tennessee, in the United States.

History
Mill Branch was named from a mill built there around 1820.

See also
List of rivers of Tennessee

References

Rivers of Hickman County, Tennessee
Rivers of Tennessee